2017 Thai League 4 Bangkok Metropolitan Region is the 9th season of the League competition since its establishment in 2009. It is in the 4th tier of the Thai football league system.

Changes from last season

Team changes

Promoted clubs

Promoted to the 2017 Thai League 2
 Kasetsart University

Three club was promoted to the 2017 Thai League 3 Southern Region.
 Chamchuri United
 BU.Deffo
 Army

Promoted from 2016 Thai Division 3 Tournament Central Region
 Singburi Kopoon

Relegated clubs
 Air Force Robinson Relegated to 2016 Thai Division 3 Tournament Central Region

Relocated clubs
Samut Prakan were moved from the Eastern 2016.
Samut Prakan United were moved from the Bangkok & Eastern 2016.
PTU Pathum Thani were moved from the Central Region 2016.

Renamed clubs
 Bangkok Glass B authorize from Rangsit
 Singburi Kopoon was renamed to Kopoon Warrior

Reserving clubs
 Bangkok Glass B is Bangkok Glass Reserving this team which join Northern Region first time.
 Bangkok United B is Bangkok United Reserving this team which join Northern Region first time.

Stadium and locations

League table

Results 1st and 2nd match for each team

Results 3rd match for each team
In the third leg, the winner on head-to-head result of the first and the second leg will be home team. If head-to-head result are tie, must to find the home team from head-to-head goals different. If all of head-to-head still tie, must to find the home team from penalty kickoff on the end of each second leg match (This penalty kickoff don't bring to calculate points on league table, it's only the process to find the home team on third leg).

Season statistics

Top scorers
As of 11 September 2017.

Attendance

See also
 2017 Thai League
 2017 Thai League 2
 2017 Thai League 3
 2017 Thai League 4
 2017 Thailand Amateur League
 2017 Thai FA Cup
 2017 Thai League Cup
 2017 Thailand Champions Cup

References

External links
 Thai League 4
 http://fathailand.org/news/97
 http://www.thailandsusu.com/webboard/index.php?topic=379167.0

4